Uniform convergence in probability is a form of convergence in probability in statistical asymptotic theory and probability theory. It means that, under certain conditions, the empirical frequencies of all events in a certain event-family converge to their theoretical probabilities.  Uniform convergence in probability has applications to statistics as well as machine learning as part of statistical learning theory.

The law of large numbers says that, for each single event , its empirical frequency in a sequence of independent trials converges (with high probability) to its theoretical probability. In many application however, the need arises to judge simultaneously the probabilities of events of an entire class  from one and the same sample. Moreover it, is required that the relative frequency of the events converge to the probability uniformly over the entire class of events   The Uniform Convergence Theorem gives a sufficient condition for this convergence to hold. Roughly, if the event-family is sufficiently simple (its VC dimension is sufficiently small) then uniform convergence holds.

Definitions 

 

The Uniform Convergence Theorem states, roughly, that if  is "simple" and we draw samples independently (with replacement) from  according to any distribution , then with high probability, the empirical frequency will be close to its expected value, which is the theoretical probability.

Here "simple" means that the Vapnik–Chervonenkis dimension of the class  is small relative to the size of the sample. In other words, a sufficiently simple collection of functions behaves roughly the same on a small random sample as it does on the distribution as a whole.

The Uniform Convergence Theorem was first proved by Vapnik and Chervonenkis using the concept of growth function.

Uniform convergence theorem 

The statement of the uniform convergence theorem is as follows:

 
 where, for any ,
 
 

 

And for any natural number , the shattering number  is defined as:
 

From the point of Learning Theory one can consider  to be the Concept/Hypothesis class defined over the instance set . Before getting into the details of the proof of the theorem we will state Sauer's Lemma which we will need in our proof.

Sauer–Shelah lemma 
The Sauer–Shelah lemma relates the shattering number  to the VC Dimension.

Lemma: , where  is the VC Dimension of the concept class .

Corollary: .

Proof of uniform convergence theorem 
Before we get into the details of the proof of the Uniform Convergence Theorem we will present a high level overview of the proof.

One can view  as the original randomly drawn sample of length , while  may be thought as the testing sample which is used to estimate .
Reduction to a finite class: We can now restrict the function class  to a fixed joint sample and hence, if  has finite VC Dimension, it reduces to the problem to one involving a finite function class.

We present the technical details of the proof.

Symmetrization 

Lemma: Let  and
 

Proof: 
By the triangle inequality, 
if  and  then .

Therefore,

 

Now for  fix an  such that . For this , we shall show that

 

Thus for any ,  and hence . And hence we perform the first step of our high level idea.

Notice,  is a binomial random variable with expectation  and variance . By Chebyshev's inequality we get

 

Permutations 

Then,

  

Proof: 
For any 

 

(since coordinate permutations preserve the product distribution .)

 

The maximum is guaranteed to exist since there is only a finite set of values that probability under a random permutation can take.

Reduction to a finite class 

Lemma: Basing on the previous lemma,
 .

Proof:

.  
Hence if we define  if  and  otherwise.

By union bound we get

 

Since, the distribution over the permutations  is uniform for each , so  equals , with equal probability.

Thus,

 

By Hoeffding's inequality, this is at most .

Finally, combining all the three parts of the proof we get the Uniform Convergence Theorem.

References

Combinatorics
Machine learning
Articles containing proofs
Probability theorems